The 1949 Little All-America college football team is composed of college football players from small colleges and universities who were selected by the Associated Press (AP) as the best players at each position. For 1949, the AP selected first, second, and third teams. 

Back Eddie LeBaron of Pacific was chosen for the first team for the third consecutive year. Andy Robustelli, chosen as a third-team end, was later inducted into the Pro Football Hall of Fame.

First team
 Back - Eddie LeBaron, Pacific
 Back - Brad Rowland, McMurry
 Back - William Young, Hillsdale
 Back - Conrad Callahan, Morningside
 End - Claude Radtke, Lawrence
 End - Charles Williams, Sam Houston
 Tackle - Herbert McKinney, Missouri Valley
 Tackle - Elbert Hammett, Wofford
 Guard - Vincent Sarratore, Chattanooga
 Guard - Art Byrd, West Carolina
 Center - Robert Numbers, Lehigh

Second team
 Back - Roland Malcolm, Gustavus Adolphus
 Back - Wilford White, Arizona State
 Back - Robert Miller, Emory & Henry
 Back - Thomas Lucia, Louisville
 End - Clifford Coggin, Mississippi Southern
 End - John Gallagher, Delaware
 Tackle - Peter Wichowski, Wesleyan
 Tackle - William Bigham, Hardin
 Guard - Warren Wood, Puget Sound
 Guard - Joseph Lucas, St. Ambrose
 Center - Lambert Oberg, Trinity

Third team
 Back - Dean Armstrong, Rensselaer
 Back - Thomas Winbigler, Idaho College
 Back - Robert McAvoy, Bowdoin
 Back - Howard Treesh, Hanover
 End - Robert McChesney, Hardin-Simmons
 End - Andy Robustelli, Arnold
 Tackle - Cecil Jackson, Juniata
 Tackle - Arnold Melvin, Elon
 Guard - Vernon Quick, Wofford
 Guard - Robert Gerhardt, Evansville
 Center - Harvey Moyer, Wofford

See also
 1949 College Football All-America Team

References

Little All-America college football team
Little All-America college football teams